Asiaephorus is a genus of moths in the family Pterophoridae.

Species
Asiaephorus extremus Gielis, 2003
Asiaephorus longicucullus Gielis, 2000
Asiaephorus narada Kovtunovich & Ustyuzhanin 2003
Asiaephorus sythoffi (Snellen, 1903)

Platyptiliini
Moth genera